The 2006 Lamar Hunt U.S. Open Cup ran from June through September, open to all soccer teams in the United States.

The Chicago Fire won 3–1 over defending-champion Los Angeles Galaxy in the final at Toyota Park in Bridgeview, Illinois. It was the Fire's fourth Open Cup title in nine years.

The early rounds were most notable for the surprising run of amateur side Dallas Roma F.C. of the North Texas Premier Soccer Association. Roma barely survived the first round in a penalty shootout win over PDL side Laredo Heat before upsetting Miami FC of the USL First Division 1–0 in the second round. Roma's biggest upset came in the third round with another shootout win, this time over CD Chivas USA.

The latter rounds of the tournament were dominated by MLS teams and both semifinals were matchups between conference rivals. The Galaxy, who had ended Roma's Cinderella run, beat Houston Dynamo in one semifinal, while Chicago beat league leader D.C. United in the other semifinal. In the championship game played at first-year Toyota Park, the host side scored two early goals en route to their 3–1 win.

Open Cup bracket
Home teams listed on top of bracket

Schedule
Note: Scorelines use the standard U.S. convention of placing the home team on the right-hand side of box scores.

Qualifying round
Teams from USASA and PDL start.

First round
Teams from USASA, PDL, and USL-2.

Second round
USL-1 teams enter.

Third round
Four MLS teams enter.

Fourth round
Eight MLS teams enter.

Quarterfinals

Semifinals

Final

Note: All times Eastern Daylight Time unless noted.

Top scorers

2006 domestic association football cups
Cup
2006